A Wall Street Tragedy is a lost 1916 silent film drama directed by Lawrence Marston and starring Nat C. Goodwin. It was released by the Mutual Film Company.

Cast
Nat C. Goodwin - Norton
Richard Neill - Ranson
Mabel Wright - Mrs. Norton
Mary Norton - Lois Norton
Zola Telmzart - Yvette
J. Cooper Willis - "The Rat"
Clifford Grey - Roy Simms

References

External links

1916 films
American silent feature films
Lost American films
American black-and-white films
Silent American drama films
1916 drama films
1916 lost films
Lost drama films
Films directed by Lawrence Marston
1910s American films